Paciorek is a surname. Notable people with the surname include:

Jaromír Paciorek (born 1979), Czech football player
Jim Paciorek (born 1960), American baseball player, brother of John and Tom
John Paciorek (born 1945), American baseball player
Tom Paciorek (born 1946), American baseball player